Abigor is an Austrian black metal band formed in 1993. They are named after an upper demon of war in Christian demonology.

History 
The band was formed in 1993 by Peter Kubik and Thomas Tannenberger. After the release of several demos, original vocalist Tharen (Alexander Opitz) left the band and was replaced by Silenius (Michael Gregor), who recorded vocals for all Abigor releases until the recording of Channeling the Quintessence of Satan during which he opted to leave the band. Thurisaz, who had been in the thrash metal band Lost Victim together with T.T. in the 1980s, joined the band and finished recordings on Channeling the Quintessence of Satan. In late 1999, T.T. left the band for various reasons (ranging from personal problems to being fed up with what once was the "scene"). After his departure, Abigor released two more albums before breaking up in 2003.

In April 2006, P.K. and T.T. decided to join forces again. During the following year, Fractal Possession was released. The band was scheduled to release a split EP in 2008 with French black metal group Blacklodge. In connection with this release, Abigor was supposedly cooperating with Norwegian experimental artist Zweizz.

Early works by Abigor were loosely inspired by J. R. R. Tolkien's The Lord of the Rings. The album cover on Orkblut – The Retaliation is a collage of 2 paintings originally made by Lord of the Rings fantasy artist Ian Miller.

The album cover on Channeling the Quintessence of Satan  was originally by the German printmaker/artist Albrecht Dürer. (The Knight, Death and the Devil, 1514)

Most Abigor releases were released by Napalm Records.

In a 2007 interview, P.K. explained the band's songwriting process: "T.T. and I are responsible for the music, A.R. will do the lyrics and vocals, that's how it works. I create riffs and record it, T.T. too, we send us files, create rough song-structures till we're satisfied with the result of a song/album-"concept" then we start the recordings at T.T.'s Hell-Lab Studio."

Personnel 
Thomas Tannenberger – bass, drums, guitar (1993–1999, 2006–present)
Peter Kubik – guitar, bass (1993–2003, 2006–present)

Former members 
Alexander Opitz – vocals (1993–1994) keyboards (1993–1998)
Michael Gregor – vocals (1994–1999)
Thurisaz – vocals (1999–2001)
Moritz Neuner – drums (1999–2003)
Stefano Fiori – vocals (2001–2003)
Lukas Lindenburger – drums (2006)
Sethnacht Eligor – vocals (2006)
Arthur Rosar – vocals (2006–2012)

Discography

Albums 
Verwüstung – Invoke the Dark Age (1994)
Nachthymnen (From the Twilight Kingdom) (1995)
Opus IV (1996)
Supreme Immortal Art (1998)
Channeling the Quintessence of Satan (1999)
Satanized (A Journey Through Cosmic Infinity) (2001)
Fractal Possession (2007)
Time Is the Sulphur in the Veins of the Saint – An Excursion on Satan's Fragmenting Principle (2010)
Leytmotif Luzifer (The 7 Temptations of Man) (2014)
Höllenzwang (Chronicles of Perdition) (2018)
Four Keys to a Foul Reich (2019)
Totschläger – (A Saintslayer's Songbook) (2020)

EPs 
Orkblut – The Retaliation (1995, re-released 2006)
Apokalypse (1997)
Structures of Immortality (7" vinyl, 1998)
In Memory... (2000)
Shockwave 666 (Dark Horizon Records, 2004)

Demos 
Ash Nazg... (1993)
Lux Devicta Est (1993)
In Hate and Sin (1994)
Promo Tape II/94 (1994)
Moonrise (1994)

Re-issues 
Origo Regium 1993–1994 (demos re-release, 1998)
Nachthymnen + Orkblut (remastered two albums on one CD, 2004)
Verwüstung + Opus IV (remastered double CD, 2004)

References

External links 
Official website

Austrian heavy metal musical groups
Austrian black metal musical groups
Musical groups established in 1993
Austrian musical trios
1993 establishments in Austria